Arthur Bernard Riviere (August 2, 1899 – September 27, 1965) was a Major League Baseball pitcher.

External links

1899 births
1965 deaths
Major League Baseball pitchers
Baseball players from Texas
St. Louis Cardinals players
Chicago White Sox players